Thanjavur Muthu Pallakku Festival is a festival celebrated every year in Thanjavur, Tamil Nadu, India.

Gnanasambandar Gurupuja
This festival is celebrated in commemoration of the Gurupuja of Gnanasambandar, in the Tamil month of Vaikasi.

Pearl Palanquins
During this festival Muruga and Vinayaka will come in the Muthu Pallakku also known as Pearl Palanquin. They would go around the four main streets of Thanjavur such as East Street, North Street, West Street and South Street, to the accompaniment of melas and nadasvarams. The palanquins which start the journey the previous day night would continue their journey till the morning of next day.

Festival
The palanquins, anointed on chariots from many temples in Thanjavur including Vellai Vinayakar Temple of East Gate, Muruga Temple of West Rampart, Muruga Temple of Chinna Arisikkara Street, Jothivinayaka Temple of Manambuchavadi Vijayamandapa Street, Kamalaratna Vinayaka Temple of South Street, Muruga Temple of Kurichi Street and Muruga Temple of Attumanthai Anjalkara Street having the processional deities of Muruga and Vinayaka would go around the main streets of Thanjavur. In some palanquins Gnanasambandar is also found. They would be decorated with electric lights and colour papers very aesthetically.  During this year only comparatively less number of devotees participated in the festival.

References

External Links
 தஞ்சாவூரில் முத்துப்பல்லக்கு விழா, விடிய விடிய பொதுமக்கள் தரிசனம், தினமணி, 12 சூன் 2017
 தஞ்சாவூரில் முத்துப்பல்லக்கில் விநாயகர், முருகன் வீதி உலா, திரளான பக்தர்கள் சாமி தரிசனம்,  தினத்தந்தி, 11 சூன் 2017
 தஞ்சாவூரில் 8 கோயில் முருகன், விநாயகர் முத்துப்பல்லக்கில் வீதி உலா, பக்தர்கள் தரிசனம்,  தினமலர் கோயில்கள், 19 மே 2022

Photogallery

Hindu festivals
Tamil culture
Thanjavur district
Religious festivals in India